Phyllonorycter helianthemella is a moth of the family Gracillariidae. It is found from Germany to the Iberian Peninsula, Italy and Greece and also on the Canary Islands (La Palma and Tenerife).

Ecology
The larvae feed on Cistus monspeliensis, Cistus salvifolius, and Helianthemum canariense. They mine the leaves of their host plant. The mine starts as an epidermal lower-surface corridor that closely follows a thick vein. It continues into a tentifom mine with strong folds, that may occupy almost an entire leaf. The frass is deposited in a loose accumulation. Pupation occurs outside of the mine, in a cocoon in a leaf fold.

References

helianthemella
Moths of Africa
Moths of Europe
Insects of the Canary Islands
Taxa named by Gottlieb August Wilhelm Herrich-Schäffer
Moths described in 1861